Maynardville (originally named Liberty) is a city in and the county seat of Union County, Tennessee, United States. The city was named to honor Horace Maynard, who successfully defended the creation of Union County from a challenge from Knox County. Its population was 2,413 at the 2010 census, up from 1,782 at the 2000 census. It is included in the Knoxville metropolitan statistical area.

History
Maynardville began in the early 19th century as a small community known as Liberty.  When Union County was created in the 1850s, Liberty, being nearest the center of the county, was chosen as the county seat.  The land for the courthouse square was donated by Marcus Monroe (1793–1870), a local minister.

Shortly after the Tennessee General Assembly passed legislation authorizing the creation of Union County, Knox County secured an injunction blocking the creation of the new county, which would take some of its area from Knox County. To defend the new county, its supporters retained the services of Horace Maynard (1814–1882), a Knoxville-area attorney and later U.S. Postmaster General. After Maynard successfully defended the new county in litigation proceedings, Liberty was renamed "Maynardville" in his honor.  Union County was formally recognized in 1856.

Country music singer Roy Acuff was born in Maynardville in 1903. The Acuff family had been well-established in Union County since the mid-19th century. When Goodspeed published its History of Tennessee in 1887, the Union County section included a brief biography of Roy's grandfather, Coram Acuff (1846–1931), who represented Union County in the state legislature.

Throughout the early to mid-20th century, State Route 33 through Maynardville was part of the infamous Thunder Road, which was used by bootleggers to illegally transport and trade moonshine. This story was later fictionally adapted into a 1958 crime-drama film and song of the same name.

Since the dawn of the 21st century, Maynardville has become increasingly suburban with the widening projects of SR 33 (Maynardville Highway) providing quicker access to Knoxville. Plans to redevelop and revitalize Maynardville have been proposed since the 2010s.

Geography
Like most mountains in the Ridge-and-Valley Appalachians, these two ridges are long and narrow, and often fractured into smaller hills and knobs.

Maynardville is concentrated around a stretch of State Route 33, which connects the city to Knoxville  to the southwest and  Tazewell  to the northeast. State Route 61 connects Maynardville with Luttrell  and Blaine  to the south, and State Route 144 connects Maynardville with Plainview  to the southwest.

Demographics

2020 census

As of the 2020 United States census, there were 2,456 people, 896 households, and 528 families residing in the city.

2000 census
As of the census of 2000,  1,782 people, 683 households, and 463 families were residing in the city. The population density was 330.1 people per square mile (127.4/km2). The 769 housing units averaged 142.4 per sq mi (55.0/km2). The racial makeup of the city was 98.37% White, 0.17% African American, 0.06% Native American, 0.11% Asian, and 1.29% from two or more races. Hispanics or Latinos of any race were 0.34% of the population.

Of the 683 households, 37.0% had children under the age of 18 living with them, 49.9% were married couples living together, 14.9% had a female householder with no husband present, and 32.1% were not families. About 28.8% of all households were made up of individuals, and 10.8% had someone living alone who was 65 years of age or older. The average household size was 2.46, and the average family size was 3.03.

In the city, the age distribution was 26.9% under  18, 8.0% from 18 to 24, 32.7% from 25 to 44, 18.6% from 45 to 64, and 13.9% who were 65 or older. The median age was 34 years. For every 100 females, there were 93.1 males. For every 100 females age 18 and over, there were 90.1 males.

The median income for a household in the city was $23,077, and for a family was $30,398. Males had a median income of $25,278 versus $18,603 for females. The per capita income for the city was $12,168. About 20.2% of families and 26.4% of the population were below the poverty line, including 34.8% of those under age 18 and 32.9% of those age 65 or over.

Economy
According to 2010 Census report published by the East Tennessee Development District in 2012, the top three industries employing residents of Maynardville were professional services, trade, and manufacturing.

Nearly 62% of the city's population was reported to commute outside of Union County for employment in 2010.

Government

Municipal
Maynardville uses the aldermanic-manager system, which was established in 1870 when the city was incorporated. It is governed locally by a five-member board of mayor and aldermen. The citizens elect the mayor and four aldermen to four-year terms. The board elects a vice mayor from among the four aldermen.

State
Maynardville is represented in the 36th District of the Tennessee House of Representatives by Dennis Powers, a Republican.

It is represented in the 8th District of the Tennessee Senate by Frank Niceley, also a Republican.

Federal
Maynardville is represented in the United States House of Representatives by Republican Chuck Fleischmann of the 3rd congressional district.

Notable people
 Roy Acuff (1903–1992), country music singer-songwriter, Grand Ole Opry regular, Governor of Tennessee candidate, and musician
 Kenny Chesney
 Carl Smith (1927–2010), country music, countrypolitan, and rockabilly singer-songwriter, musician

In popular culture
In the 2009 film Inglourious Basterds, the character of 1 SSF First Lieutenant Aldo Raine, portrayed by Brad Pitt, is said to be a moonshiner from Maynardville.

The song "The Ballad of Thunder Road", references Maynardville.

References

External links
 
 Municipal Technical Advisory Service entry for Maynardville — information on local government, elections, and link to charter
 

Cities in Tennessee
Cities in Union County, Tennessee
County seats in Tennessee
Knoxville metropolitan area